The 2nd China–Japan–Korea Friendship Athletic Meeting were held at the Sapporo Atsubetsu Park Stadium in Sapporo, Japan on July 12, 2015.

Medal summary

Men

Women

Score table

Overall

Men

Women

Results

Men

200 meters
Prior to the competition, the records were as follows:

Final – 15:40 –

Wind: +2.1 m/s

800 meters
Prior to the competition, the records were as follows:

Final – 14:40 –

400 meters hurdles
Prior to the competition, the records were as follows:

Final – 14:10 –

4 x 400 meters relay
Prior to the competition, the records were as follows:

Final – 13:00 –

High jump
Prior to the competition, the records were as follows:

Final – 14:00 –

Triple jump
Prior to the competition, the records were as follows:

Final – 15:00 –

Shot put
Prior to the competition, the records were as follows:

Final – 13:00 –

Women

100 meters
Prior to the competition, the records were as follows:

Final – 13:30 –

Wind: +1.8 m/s

400 meters
Prior to the competition, the records were as follows:

Final – 16:10 –

100 meters hurdles
Prior to the competition, the records were as follows:

Final – 14:55 –

Wind: +2.5 m/s

4 x 100 meters relay
Prior to the competition, the records were as follows:

Final – 16:40 –

Pole vault
Prior to the competition, the records were as follows:

Final – 13:00 –

Long jump
Prior to the competition, the records were as follows:

Final – 13:00 –

Shot put
Prior to the competition, the records were as follows:

Final – 13:00 –

References 

김승욱 (2015-07-13). 정일우, 남자 포환던지기 한국신기록…19m49. Yonhap. Retrieved on 2016-05-22.
Timetable. Official website (archived). Retrieved on 2016-05-22.
Athlete. Official website (archived). Retrieved on 2016-05-22.
Reports
rikuren jihou (P.3-5). JAAF. Retrieved on 2016-05-22.
Results
results. JAAF. Retrieved on 2016-05-22.
results. AthleteRanking.com. Retrieved on 2016-05-22.

External links
Japan Association of Athletics Federations

China-Japan-Korea Friendship Athletic Meeting
International athletics competitions hosted by Japan
China–Japan–Korea Friendship Athletic Meeting